SB Line has the following meanings:

SB Line (Norfolk Southern), a rail line in the United States
Nike Skateboarding, a shoe line